"Jeans On" is a song by British musician David Dundas from his 1977 self-titled debut album. Released as a single the previous year, it was first featured as a television advertising jingle for Brutus Jeans. The popularity of the commercial eventually led to the recording of "Jeans On" as a full-length song, with some lyrical changes.

The single eventually became Dundas's biggest hit, peaking at number 3 on the UK Singles Chart and number 17 on the U.S. Billboard Hot 100. It became a chart hit all over Western and Northern Europe, including a number 1 in West Germany.

Dundas also recorded a French language version of the song, titled "Blue Jeans".

The opening electric piano riff of the song was looped and sampled for British electronic musician Fatboy Slim's 1998 track "Sho Nuff"; as a result, Dundas is credited as a co-writer on the track.

The song is covered by Keith Urban in the 2002 album Golden Road.

Charts

Weekly charts

Year-end charts

See also
 List of 1970s one-hit wonders in the United States

References

1976 songs
1976 debut singles
Number-one singles in Germany
Songs written by Roger Greenaway
Chrysalis Records singles